Heather Margaret Murray Reid  (born c. 1969), also known as "Heather the Weather", is a Scottish meteorologist, physicist, science communicator and educator. She was formerly a broadcaster and weather presenter for BBC Scotland.

Career

Reid was born in Paisley. She graduated from the University of Edinburgh with an honours degree in physics followed by a master's degree in satellite image processing from the University's Meteorology Department. In 1993 Reid took a position at the UK Met Office working in satellite research. From 1994 to 2009 she worked as a weather presenter for BBC Scotland, presenting on Reporting Scotland. She became BBC Scotland's senior weather forecaster, and gave her final broadcast for Reporting Scotland on 22 December 2009. Reid now works as a science education consultant, and in the public promotion of science.

From 1999 to 2001 Reid was Chairperson of the Institute of Physics in Scotland, she has also served as a Council member and non-executive director of the Institute in London.

In the summer of 2006 Reid became a member of the Board of Trustees of Glasgow Science Centre, maintaining a connection that has seen her involved in various stages with the Centre, notably developing educational weather shows and workshops.

Reid is a member of the Science and Engineering Education Advisory Group set up by the Scottish Government.

Awards and honours 
Reid is a Fellow of the Royal Meteorological Society, and has an honorary lectureship in the Physics and Astronomy Department at the University of Glasgow. In 2001 she was awarded the Public Awareness of Physics prize from the Institute of Physics for her science communication work, and in 2004 received the Institute's prestigious Kelvin Medal. In 2003 Reid received an honorary doctorate from Paisley University, and on 16 June 2010 she was awarded an honorary doctorate by the University of Glasgow.

Reid was awarded an Order of the British Empire (OBE) for services to physics in the 2007 New Year Honours list, announced on 30 December 2006.

Popular culture

Edinburgh band Randan Discothèque's 2010 single "Heather the Weather" is a homage to Heather Reid.

Personal life 
Reid resides in Glasgow with her husband Miles Padgett, a professor of physics, and their daughter.

References

External links

British Council feature
Featured interview by Girl Guiding Scotland (archive)

Alumni of the University of Edinburgh
1969 births
Fellows of the Institute of Physics
Living people
Scottish meteorologists
Scottish physicists
Officers of the Order of the British Empire
Scottish women physicists
People from Paisley, Renfrewshire
BBC weather forecasters
Scottish television presenters
Scottish women television presenters
Academics of the University of Glasgow
BBC people
Science communicators